Miani may refer to:

People with the surname 
 Elmer Osmar Ramón Miani (1933–2014), Argentine Roman Catholic bishop
 Giovanni Miani (1810–1872), Italian explorer.
 Hieronimo Miani, Italian-born Danish history painter
 Marcello Miani (born 1984), Italian rower
 Valeria Miani (1563–1620), Italian playwright

Places 
 Miani, Jalandhar, Punjab, India
 Hebran, Iran, also known as Mīānī
 Miani, Chakwal, Punjab, Pakistan
 Miani, Punjab, Pakistan
 Miani, Sindh, Pakistan

Other uses 
 Miani (Pashtun tribe)
 Miani language, spoken in Papua New Guinea
 Miani railway station, in Pakistan
 Battle of Miani, part of the British conquest of Sindh

See also
 
 Maini (disambiguation)
 Meeanee, New Zealand